Pamela Blair (born December 5, 1949), known as Pam, is an American actress, singer, and dancer best known for originating the role of "Val" in the musical A Chorus Line and several appearances on American soap operas.

Early life and career
Born in Bennington, Vermont, to Edgar Joseph and Geraldine Marie (Cummings) Blair; she was raised in a small town with her pony, Tonka. She studied dance, played sports, and dreamed of becoming a Radio City Rockette in order to meet her idols, The Beatles. At age 16, she moved to New York City to attend a private school, The National Academy of Ballet, in her senior year of high school. She studied acting at HB Studio. She later met a friend at a dance class who told her Michael Bennett was looking for dancers for Promises, Promises. Pam auditioned and was hired. Blair comments, "Whenever I don't seem to be getting anywhere in this business, I try to remember that I was once a chambermaid in a small motel in Vermont." She continued to build credits with Seesaw, another Michael Bennett production, and then landed the coveted role of "Curly's Wife", the only female role in the James Earl Jones Broadway revival of Of Mice and Men which later opened at the Kennedy Center to critical acclaim. She also appeared in Sugar, the stage musical version of the film Some Like It Hot, in which she played "Sugar Kane", a role made famous by Marilyn Monroe.

A Chorus Line and Broadway fame
In 1974, Blair was invited by Michael Bennett to participate in the workshops from which A Chorus Line was developed. The character of "Valerie Clark" was in large part, based on her own life, although the surgical enhancement came from another dancer.  "Val was based on Mitzi Hamilton, who actually underwent surgery to enhance her figure, and Pam Blair, whose mixture of angelic appearance and ribald tongue entertained Bennett enormously". The angelic looking yet sexy Val has a foul mouth, and introduces the popular Broadway song "Dance: 10; Looks: 3" which tells the story of an unattractive yet talented girl who uses plastic surgery to help her get cast in roles.  The song is also known by its chorus, "Tits and Ass".  Val is one of the larger roles, and Blair received much attention. Along with the cast, Blair won the 1976 Theatre World Award for Ensemble Performance for the show.

She next originated the role of "Amber" (later "Angel") in 1978's The Best Little Whorehouse in Texas.  Her turn as an eager to work prostitute earned her a Drama Desk Award nomination.  She can be heard on the cast recording as the lead in Hard Candy Christmas, although the song "Bus from Amarillo" was taken from her before the show opened.  Further roles on Broadway include King of Hearts (in the Geneviève Bujold role), "Clelia" in The Nerd, and "Joanne" in A Few Good Men, directed by her then estranged husband, Don Scardino.

Television, film, and later career
Blair has made several appearances on American soap operas such as Loving, Another World, Ryan's Hope, and All My Children, for which she received a Daytime Emmy nomination.  She has guest starred on such shows as Law & Order, The Cosby Show, The Days and Nights of Molly Dodd, and Sabrina, the Teenage Witch. Blair guest starred in a Movie of The Week titled MANEATER for Lifetime.  She appeared opposite Jodie Foster in the TV film Svengali and in feature films Mighty Aphrodite directed by Woody Allen, 21 Grams with Sean Penn and Benicio del Toro, Before and After with Meryl Streep and Liam Neeson and Annie as the maid Annette ("The silk, no the satin sheets, I think!").

Blair lived in Hollywood, California for a time, where she landed the role of Sabrina's mother on Sabrina, the Teenage Witch, although high-profile on-camera success eluded her.  However, she has continued to amass many regional and national credits, and still appears in sexually appealing roles such as "Heddi La Rue" in How to Succeed in Business Without Really Trying. In 2006, she appeared in the lead role of Miss Mona with the Phoenix Theater's production of The Best Little Whorehouse in Texas, directed by Michael Barnard.  As noted above, Blair was in the original cast of the musical.

She married actor and director, Don Scardino in 1984, and they divorced in 1991. She lived in Northern New Jersey for a time, and now resides in Arizona where she owns her own Therapeutic and Myofascial Massage Studio for athletes.

Awards

Credits

Theater (Broadway)

Film and television

References

Flinn, Denny Martin, What They Did for Love: The Untold Story Behind the Making of A Chorus Line, Bantam Books, 1989.  
Kelly, Kevin, One Singular Sensation: The Michael Bennett Story, Zebra Biography, 1990.  
Mandelbaum, Ken, A Chorus Line and the Musicals of Michael Bennett, St. Martin's Press, 1989.  
Viagas, Robert, Baayork Lee, and Thommie Walsh, On the Line: The Creation of A Chorus Line, Morrow, 1990

External links

1949 births
Living people
American female dancers
American dancers
American film actresses
American soap opera actresses
American stage actresses
American television actresses
Actresses from Vermont
People from Bennington, Vermont
21st-century American women